Turret Peak may refer to:

Turret Peak (Antarctica) in Antarctica
Turret Peak (Colorado) in Colorado in the United States
Turret Peak (Wyoming) in Wyoming in the United States

It may also refer to:

 The Battle of Turret Peak in 1873 between the United States Army and members of the Yavapai and Apache tribes